Hist may refer to:
 History
 College Historical Society
 Sør-Trøndelag University College (Norwegian: , HiST)

See also 
 History (disambiguation)